The Ipswich Society of Professional & Amateur Artists was an organisation founded in 1832 by Henry Davy in Ipswich, Suffolk.

References

Ipswich
Arts organisations based in England